Milan Velimirović, (21 April 1952 – 25 February 2013) was a Serbian chess problemist and publisher.

Milan Velimirović was born in Niš, Yugoslavia. Velimirović gained the title International solving grandmaster in 1984 and Grandmaster of chess compositions in 2010. He was also editor of Mat Plus Review and author of MatPlus Librarian software for chess problems.

Try:
1.Qf3!? (threats: 2.Qd3#)
1... Rg3 2.Bd5# (Bristol)
1... Bg3 2.Qc3#
1... c6 2.Nxd6#
But: 1...Rb5!

Solution:
1.Qb1! (threats: 2.Qd3#)
1... Rg3 2.Qb5#
1... Bg3 2.Rb4# (Bristol)
1... c6 2.Nb6#
1... Nc2 2. Qa2#

Example of the Bristol theme.

Books 
 Milan Velimirović and Kari Valtonen: Encyclopedia of Chess Problems - Themes and Terms.  Chess Informant, Belgrade 2012.  
 Milan Velimirović and Marjan Kovačević: 2345 Chess problems – Anthology of Chess Combinations. Chess Informant, Belgrade 1997.

References

External links
 Velimirović problems  at the PDB Server
 New Mat Plus Home Page

1952 births
2013 deaths
International solving grandmasters
Serbian chess players